The Education of Mr. Pipp is a lost 1914 silent film comedy based on the play by Augustus Thomas and Charles Dana Gibson. It starred stage actor Digby Bell recreating his role from the play.

Cast
Digby Bell - Mr. Pipp
Kate Jepson - Mrs. Pipp
Belle Daube - Ida Pipp
Edna Mae Wilson - Julia Pipp (*as Edna Brun)
Henry Driscole - Count Charmount
George Irving - John Willing
Stanley Dark - Dix de la Touraine
Harry Blakemore - Baron Haussling (H. D. Blakemore)
Mona Ryan - Lady Fitzmaurice
Frank Patton - Lord Herbert Fitzmaurice
William A. Evans - Prefect of Police

References

External links
The Education of Mr. Pipp at IMDb.com
allmovie/synopsis

1914 films
American silent feature films
Lost American films
American films based on plays
1914 comedy films
American black-and-white films
Silent American comedy films
1914 lost films
Lost comedy films
1910s American films